The Potrero Hills are a low mountain range in the Sacramento–San Joaquin River Delta area of southern Solano County, California.

Geography
The range is located in the southwestern Sacramento Valley, northeast of Suisun Bay, and southeast of the city of Fairfield.  It is part of the Northern Inner Coast Ranges group in the California Coast Ranges System.

The Rush Ranch Open Space Preserve unit of the San Francisco Bay National Estuarine Research Reserve is located on Suisun Bay at the western side of the Potrero Hills.

See also

References 

Mountain ranges of Solano County, California
California Coast Ranges
Hills of California
Geography of the Sacramento Valley
Fairfield, California
Sacramento–San Joaquin River Delta
Mountain ranges of the San Francisco Bay Area